Robert Seldon Lady (born February 2, 1954 in Tegucigalpa, Honduras; nicknamed "Mister Bob") is a United States agent convicted of kidnapping in Italy for his role in the CIA's abduction of Egyptian cleric Hassan Mustafa Osama Nasr in February 2003, while Lady was CIA station chief in Milan.

Lady was arrested in Panama on July 18, 2013. He had been a fugitive from Italian police after being convicted of kidnapping Nasr in February 2003, in what the Italian press are referring to as the Imam Rapito (or "kidnapped imam") affair. He was released on July 19, 2013, and immediately boarded a flight direct to the United States.

Background
Lady grew up in Honduras and became a New Orleans Police Department police officer in the 1970s.

The Imam Rapito affair
Italian authorities proved in court that in 2003, Lady helped a team of CIA agents kidnap Nasr (see extraordinary rendition) as he walked to his mosque in Milan for noon prayers. Lady is said to have travelled to Egypt soon after the operation, where Nasr was interrogated and tortured.

Lady initially claimed diplomatic immunity in an effort to avoid judicial proceedings against him in Italy, but in November 2005, an Italian judge rejected this request, stating that Lady had forfeited his immunity when he retired from the CIA, and also that the alleged abduction was in any case a crime serious enough to disqualify him from immunity.

Lady, and his wife Martha, retired to northern Italy, near Asti, in September 2003. When the Italian police raided his home in June 2005, Lady was not there. The wall street journal reports he lives in Miami, FL United States.

2007 indictment
In January 2007, an Italian court ordered Lady's home in the Piedmont region of Northern Italy seized to cover court costs.

On February 16, 2007, an arrest warrant was issued for Lady for the kidnapping of Abu Omar.  An Italian prosecutor, Armando Spataro, was scheduled to begin trying the case in June 2007.  Lady's Italian lawyer, Daria Pesce, withdrew from the case shortly after the beginning of legal proceedings, saying her client refused to cooperate with the court proceedings because he believed the matter should be settled through a political, rather than legal solution. Lady dismissed his attorney soon afterwards, although the court in Milan appointed a public defense attorney for him. The trial against Lady and the other US defendants began in absentia later that month, although it was quickly adjourned until October 2007.

In an interview with GQ Magazine in March 2007, Lady said of his superiors at the CIA that "the agency has told me to keep quiet and let this blow over."

2009 interview
In June 2009, Robert Seldon Lady was quoted by Il Giornale as saying of the kidnapping, 

He said of Abu Omar's abduction, "Of course it was an illegal operation. But that's our job. We're at war against terrorism."

2009 conviction
On November 4, 2009, Italian Judge Oscar Magi convicted Lady, along with 22 other accused CIA employees, of kidnapping, handing down an eight-year sentence. The New York Times called this decision a "landmark ruling" and an "enormous symbolic victory" for Italian prosecutors because it "was the first ever to contest the United States practice of rendition, in which terrorism suspects are captured in one country and taken for questioning in another, presumably one more open to coercive interrogation techniques."

On July 18, 2013, according to the Italian Justice Ministry, Lady was arrested in Panama. He was released the next day.

See also
 The CIA and the Cult of Intelligence, a 1974 book on the culture of lawlessness in the CIA.
Eliana Castaldo
Joseph L. Romano

References

External links
Robert Seldon Lady & Extraordinary Rendition on Al Jazeera English's People & Power, presented by Max Keiser at 

1954 births
American kidnappers
CIA agents convicted of crimes
Extraordinary rendition program
Fugitives wanted by Italy
Fugitives wanted on kidnapping charges
Living people
Prisoners and detainees of Panama